Glistening Pleasure 2.0 is the second studio album by Seattle indie band Brite Futures, formerly Natalie Portman's Shaved Head. The album is their first release under their new band name. It features remastered versions of most of the songs that were on their first full-length album, Glistening Pleasure, excluding the songs "Mouth Full of Bones," "The Malibu Highlife" and "Beard Lust," all of which were not rereleased.

Prior to 2.0'''s release, the band took Glistening Pleasure out of production and off the market.

The album's title is a tongue-in-cheek spinoff of Justin Bieber's album My World 2.0''.

Track listing
 "Me + Yr Daughter" – 4:29
 "Slow Motion Tag Team" – 3:15
 "My Funk" – 3:10
 "Iceage Babeland" – 4:05
 "Sophisticated Side Ponytail" - 2:50
 "Holding Hands in the Shower" – 3:15
 "L.A. Noir" – 3:52
 "Staying Cool" – 3:45
 "Hush Hush" – 3:19
 "Bedroom Costume" – 3:07
 "Confections" – 4:38
 "Dog Eared Summer" - 4:17

2010 albums
Reissue albums